The Cooper Bison Kill Site is an archaeological site near Fort Supply in Harper County, Oklahoma, United States.  Located along the Beaver River, it was explored in 1993 and 1994 and found to contain artifacts of the Folsom tradition, including arrowheads.  It is believed that these artifacts are the results of hunters killing bison in an arroyo.  The hunters of this culture found the site continuously useful; the known artifacts are believed to be the results of three different hunts.

Archaeology in America described the Cooper Site as "...a gully feeding the North Canadian River," which contained evidence of three separate kills, with between twenty and thirty animals in each kill. All three kills occurred during late summer or early fall, and each kill contained the remains of cows, calves and young bulls.  Tools found at the site consisted only of projectile points and large flake knives.

The site has been dated to 10,900-10,200 years ago. In 2002, the site was listed on the National Register of Historic Places.

A unique find at the site was that of a Bison antiquus skull, painted with a red zigzag. The Cooper Bison Skull is oldest known painted object in North America. The skull is currently in the collection of the Sam Noble Oklahoma Museum of Natural History at the Norman campus of the University of Oklahoma.

Notes

References

Additional information
 Bement, Leland C. Bison hunting at Cooper site: where lightning bolts drew thundering herds. Norman: University of Oklahoma Press, 1999: 37, 43, 176. .
 Bement, Leland C. "Folsom Bison Hunting on the Southern Plains." Arrowheads.com Accessed November 14, 2016.

External links
 Encyclopedia of Oklahoma History and Culture - Cooper Site
 "National Register Properties in Oklahoma: Cooper Bison Kill Site (34HP45)". Image of arrowheads found at the site. Accessed November 14, 2016.

Archaeological sites on the National Register of Historic Places in Oklahoma
Buffalo jumps
Geography of Harper County, Oklahoma
National Register of Historic Places in Harper County, Oklahoma